Once Fallen is a 2010 crime film starring Brian Presley, Taraji P. Henson, and Ed Harris. Filming took place in Los Angeles, California.

Plot
Chance (Brian Presley) returns home from a half decade in jail determined to change his life. He tries to make peace with his father (Ed Harris), the head of the Aryan Brotherhood at the prison where he is serving a life sentence for murder. Chance's release is quickly marred when he has to help his best friend with a debt to a local mobster.
When Chance gets home to his ex-girlfriend's house, he finds out that he has a son named August. After he meets Pearl, a friend of his ex-girlfriend, Chance then sets himself on the path of changing his life around.

Cast
 Brian Presley as Chance Ryan
 Taraji P. Henson as Pearl
 Ed Harris as Liam Ryan
 Chad Lindberg as Beat
 Amy Madigan as Rose Ryan
 Peter Weller as Eddie
 Ash Adams as Rath

Music

The soundtrack to Once Fallen was released on November 9, 2010.

External links
 
 

2010 films
2010 crime drama films
Films shot in Los Angeles
American crime drama films
Films scored by Jeff Beal
MoviePass Films films
2010s English-language films
2010s American films